Philippe Sternis (born September 30, 1952, in Neuilly-sur-Seine, France) is a French cartoonist.

His work is mainly targeted for a children and teenage audience. He is a regular collaborator for the publications of the French press group Bayard Presse, who published his first work in 1974 in the magazine "Record".

Since 2005, he has illustrated the children's novels "Princesse Zélina" (9 of 16 published books are illustrated by Sternis).

He is the organizer of the comics festival of Melun Val de Seine, attended by 7000 people every two years.

Bibliography 
 Histoire de la vie des hommes for La Pibole
 "100.000 dollars pour un troupeau" 1980
 Snark Saga - Sternis and Cothias for BD Okapi.
 Book 1 : "L'Oiseau Bleu" - 1982
 Book 2 : "Le Lapin Blanc" - 1983
 Les grandes batailles de l'histoire for Larousse
 Book 6 : "La Guerre de Sécession" 1984
 Trafic - Sternis and Cothias for BD Okapi, awarded with Prix Jeunesse 9-12 ans at Angoulême International Comics Festival, France in 1985
 Memory - Sternis and Cothias for Glénat
 Book 1 : "Le Bal des Mandibules" 1986
 Book 2 : "Le Cargo sous la mer" 1987
 Book 3 : "le Nécromobile" 1988
 Mouche for Bayard
 Book 1 : "La rivière Fantôme" 1989
 Book 2 : "Le Bateau d'Antoine" 1992
 Solo - Sternis and Claude Carré 1994 chez Dargaud
 Pyrénée - Sternis and Loisel in 1998 for Vents d'Ouest
 Robinson Book 1 - Sternis in 2001 for Vents d'Ouest
 Mouche - "La rivière Fantôme" (re-colored reprint) in 2005 for Des Ronds dans l’O

External links
Philippe Sternis official site
Comic creator: Philippe Sternis at lambiek.net

1952 births
Living people
French comics artists